The 1999 Asian Archery Championships was the 11th edition of the event. It was held in Beijing, China from 1 to 6 September 1999 and was organized by Asian Archery Federation.

Medal summary

Medal table

References

 Results

External links
 www.asianarchery.com

Asian Championship
A
A
Asian Archery Championships